Joseph Sidney Finney (May 1, 1929 – February 3, 2009) was a professional ice hockey centre during the 1950s and early 1960s in the WHL.

Finney played two seasons in the NHL with the Chicago Black Hawks. He would go on to become the 13th all-time scorer in the Western Hockey League. He led the Calgary Stampeders to a championship in 1954 and led the WHL in scoring with 45 goals in 1958.

Accomplishments and awards
WHL Prairie Division First All-Star Team (1957, 1958)
Leader Cup (MVP - WHL Prairie Division) (1958)

See also
List of National Hockey League players from the United Kingdom

External links

1929 births
2009 deaths
Calgary Stampeders (WHL) players
Canadian ice hockey centres
Chicago Blackhawks players
Cincinnati Wings players
Edmonton Flyers (WHL) players
Ice hockey centres from Northern Ireland
Northern Ireland emigrants to Canada
People from Banbridge
Portland Buckaroos players
St. Louis Flyers players